Trophonopsis sublamellosa is an extinct species of sea snail, a marine gastropod mollusk in the family Muricidae, the murex snails or rock snails.

Description

Distribution
Fossils were found in Eocene strata of Paris Basin, France.

References

 Cossmann (M.) & Pissarro (G.), 1911 - Iconographie complète des coquilles fossiles de l'Éocène des environs de Paris, t. 2, p. pl. 26-45
 Le Renard, J. & Pacaud, J. (1995). Révision des mollusques Paléogènes du Bassin de Paris. II. Liste des références primaires des espèces. Cossmanniana. 3: 65-132.

External links
  Deshayes, G. P. (1824-1837). Description des coquilles fossiles des environs de Paris. Paris, published by the author.

sublamellosa
Gastropods described in 1835